Ophonus vignai is a species of ground beetle in the subfamily Harpalinae, genus Ophonus, and subgenus Ophonus (Brachyophonus).

References

vignai
Beetles described in 1987